Richard Venable (born October 2, 1944) is an American politician. He is county mayor of Sullivan County, Tennessee and is a former member of the Tennessee House of Representatives.  While county mayor, he is chairman of the Sullivan County Board of Commissioners commonly called the County Commission.  He lost his Republican Party nomination bid in first congressional district race to replace the retiring Bill Jenkins to David Davis.

References

1944 births
Living people
Heads of county government in Tennessee
Republican Party members of the Tennessee House of Representatives